Dr. José P. Rizal is an outdoor sculpture of the Filipino nationalist of the same name by Lorena Toritch, installed at Hermann Park's McGovern Centennial Gardens in Houston, Texas, in the United States. The bust was acquired by the City of Houston in 2006.

See also
 List of places named after José Rizal
 List of public art in Houston

References

Asian-American culture in Houston
Busts in Texas
Filipino-American culture
Hermann Park
Memorials to José Rizal
Monuments and memorials in Texas
Outdoor sculptures in Houston
Sculptures of men in Texas